Strittmatter is a German surname. Notable people with the surname include:

Erwin Strittmatter (1912–1994), German writer
Eva Strittmatter (1930–2011), German poet and wife of Erwin Strittmatter
Mark Strittmatter (born 1969), American baseball player and coach
Rolf Strittmatter (born 1955), Swiss bobsledder

See also
99070 Strittmatter, an asteroid

German-language surnames